Manuela Couto (born 17 February 1964 in Setúbal) is a Portuguese actress. She is known of diverse projects of television, cinema and theatre.

Televisão
 Ouro Verde (telenovela) 2017-18 Armanda Nascimento
 Santa Bárbara (telenovela) (2015–16) Paula Montemor
 Belmonte (telenovela) (2013–14) sofia 
 Doida Por Ti (2012–2013) as Preciosa Antunes
 The Simpsons Movie (Euro-Portuguese version) (2007) – Lisa Simpson
 Ilha dos Amores (2007)
 Tempo de Viver (2006)
 Coisa Ruim (2006)
 Ninguém Como Tu (2005)
 Queridas Feras (2003)
 Amanhecer (2002)
 O Último Beijo (2002)
 Cruzamentos (1999)
 António, Rapaz de Lisboa (1999)
 Fátima (1997)
 Senhores Doutores (1997)
 Coitado do Jorge (1993)
 Sozinhos em Casa (1993)
 Amor e Dedinhos de Pé (1991)
 Cacau da Ribeira (1987)

External links

Portuguese film actresses
Portuguese television actresses
Living people
People from Setúbal
1958 births